Winston Chu Ka-sun (born 1940) is a Hong Kong lawyer and activist.

Early years and education
Chu was born in Hong Kong and received his secondary school education at Wah Yan College there, after which he furthered his studies in the United Kingdom. He initially aspired to a career as a nuclear physicist, but instead ended up studying law. He graduated from University College London with a Bachelor of Laws degree and became a solicitor. Chu was also an honorary law lecturer in the Faculty of Law at the University of Hong Kong. He served on the Town Planning Board from 1988 to 1996.

Society for Protection of the Harbour
In 1994, Winston Chu founded the Society for Protection of the Harbour to preserve Victoria Harbour. From that time onwards, he worked together with his partner Christine Loh to protect the harbour. On 11 October 2003, Winston Chu announced his resignation as Chairperson of SPH due to personal threats to his family and was replaced by Loh.

References

Academic staff of the University of Hong Kong
Hong Kong legal scholars
1940 births
Living people